New River is a river located in Pasco County, Florida. It is a tributary of the Hillsborough River (Florida). It is located near Wesley Chapel, Florida.

References

Rivers of Pasco County, Florida